Melinda Mills,  (born 1969) is a Canadian and Dutch demographer and sociologist. She is currently the Nuffield Professor of Sociology at Nuffield College, University of Oxford. Mills’ research spans a range of interdisciplinary topics at the intersection of demography, sociology, molecular genetics and statistics. Her substantive research specializes in fertility and human reproductive behaviour, assortative mating, labour market, life course and inequality.

She was the Editor-in-Chief of the European Sociological Review (2012-2016), journal of the European Consortium for Sociological Research, where she was also an elected Board Member (2007-2014) and was previously Editor of International Sociology (2003-2010), journal of the International Sociological Association.

In 2009 she was elected to the European Academy of Sociology and in 2018 awarded Member of the Most Excellent Order of the British Empire (MBE) in the 2018 Queen's Birthday Honours for her services to the social sciences. She is a nominated member of AcademiaNet for outstanding female academics and scientists (Nature Publication Group) and since 2013 is a member of the Council of Advisors for Population Europe.

In 2017, she received the Ministerial appointment to the Executive Council of the Economic and Social Research Council, UK and was re-appointed in 2018 to the UKRI (UK Research and Innovation) ESRC (Economic and Social Research Council). In 2018 she received the Ministerial appointment to serve on the non-Executive Supervisory Board (Raad van Toezicht) for NWO, the Dutch Science Organization.

Early life and education 
Mills was born in Red Deer, Alberta in Canada and attended River Glen Elementary and Lindsay Thurber Comprehensive High School. She studied sociology and demography at the University of Alberta, where she obtained an undergraduate BA and an MA. She received her PhD in Demography from the University of Groningen in the Netherlands. Mills has subsequently taken various PhD and related courses in molecular genetics and bioinformatics. She became dual Dutch citizen in the 2000s.

Career 
Before her time at Oxford, Mills worked at the University of Groningen and Vrije Universiteit Amsterdam in the Netherlands and Bielefeld Universität in Germany. Mills was the Head of the Department of Sociology at the University of Oxford from 2015-2018.

Mills has an interdisciplinary career spanning topic areas ranging from globalization to genes. She is known for her early work that examined the impact of globalization and uncertainty on the life course in a cross-national comparative perspective. This includes the 2005 book Globalization, Uncertainty and Youth in Society, where she co-developed a theory of how employment, economic and temporal uncertainty impact early life course decisions and Globalization, Uncertainty and Men's Careers: An International Comparison (2006).

She has also published various statistics textbooks using the computer program R to introduce survival and event history techniques (2011, Sage) and has a forthcoming book on applied quantitative statistical genetics and the use of polygenic scores for beginners (2019, MIT Press).

She is known for her interdisciplinary work on human reproduction and fertility, including the examination of why people postpone parenthood, a review of fertility research in advanced societies, the biodemography of fertility and the impact of educational field and occupations and gender equity on fertility. This work related to two large mid-career research grants first from the Dutch Science Council and later an ERC (European Research Council) Consolidator Grant SOCIOGENOME, focussing on the sociological and molecular genetic underpinnings of human reproductive behaviour and gene x environment interaction. She was the first sociologist and demographer to lead a large genome-wide association consortium uncovering genetic loci related to human reproductive behaviour - age at first birth and number of children - published in 2016 in Nature Genetics.  She is currently finalizing an extension of this original study. 
A related research interest is assortative mating using both standard survey data but also data from large internet dating companies examining differential investments in relationships, dating, and more recently cross-national research into preferences in online internet dating (ethnicity, sexuality,  and divorcees). Mills’ work has also examined nonstandard schedules and chronotypes, examining the impact of nonstandard (evening, night work, shift work) on partnerships, interactions with children, and childbearing.

Honours 

In 2009 she was elected to the European Academy of Sociology. She is a nominated member of AcademiaNet for outstanding female academics and Scientists (Nature Publication Group) and since 2013 is a member of the Council of Advisors for Population Europe.

Since 2014, Mills is a Governing Body Member of Nuffield College Oxford.

In 2017, she received the Ministerial appointment to the Executive Council of the Economic and Social Research Council, UK and was re-appointed in 2018 to the UKRI (UK Research and Innovation) ESRC (Economic and Social Research Council). In 2018 she received the Ministerial appointment to serve on the non-Executive Supervisory Board (Raad van Toezicht) for NWO, the Dutch Science Organization.

Mills was appointed Member of the Most Excellent Order of the British Empire (MBE) in the 2018 Queen's Birthday Honours for her services to the social sciences.

In July 2018 she was elected Fellow of the British Academy (FBA).

Selected publications

2017

Tropf, F.C.  et al. M.C. Mills. (2017). ‘Hidden heritability due to heterogeneity across seven populations,’ Nature Human Behaviour, 1: 757-765. To access this publication: rdcu.be/vM1N
Verweij, R.M., M.C. Mills et al. (2017). ‘Sexual dimorphism in the genetic influence on human childlessness,’ European Journal of Human Genetics, 25: 1067-74. [OPEN ACCESS]
Mills, M.C., N. Barban & F.C. Tropf. (forthcoming). ‘The Sociogenomics of Polygenic Scores of Reproductive Behavior and Their Relationship to Other Fertility Traits,’ RSF: The Russell Sage Foundation Journal of the Social Sciences 4(4), doi: 10.7758/RSF.2018.4.4.07.
Präg, P. & M.C. Mills. (2017). ‘Cultural determinants influence assisted reproduction usage in Europe more than economic and demographic factors’, Human Reproduction, 32(11): 2305-2314. [OPEN ACCESS]
Barbuscia, A. & M. C. Mills. (2017). ‘Cognitive development in children up to age 11 years born after ART – a longitudinal cohort study,’ Human Reproduction. 32(7): 1482-88. [OPEN ACCESS]
Präg, P. & M. C. Mills (2017). “Assisted Reproductive Technology in Europe: Usage and Regulation in the Context of Cross-Border Reproductive Care,” pp. 289–309, in: Childlessness in Europe: Contexts, Causes and Consequences. Springer. [OPEN ACCESS]
Briley, D., F.C. Tropf, M.C.Mills (2017). “What explains the heritability of completed fertility? Evidence from Two large Twin Studies,” Behaviour Genetics, 47(1): 36-51.
Potârcă, G., M. Mills & M. van Duijn. (2017). The Choices and Constraints of Secondary Singles. Willingness to Stepparent among Divorced Online Daters across Europe, Journal of Family Issues, 38(10): 1443-1470.
Präg, P, R. Wittek, M.C.Mills (2017). “The educational gradient in self-rated health in Europe: Does the doctor-patient relationship make a difference?” Acta Sociologica, 60(4): 325-341.

2016

Barban, N.......M.C. Mills (2016). Genome-wide analysis identifies 12 loci influencing human reproductive behavior, Nature Genetics, 48: 1462-1472, doi: 10.1038/ng.3698
Courtiol, A., F.C. Tropf & M.C.Mills (2016) When genes and environment disagree: making sense of trends in recent human evolution, Proceedings of the National Academy of Sciences PNAS, 113(26): 7693-7695, doi: 10.1073/pnas.1608532113 
Okbay, A. et al. (2016) Genetic variants associated with subjective well-being, depressive symptoms and neuroticism identified through genome-wide analyses. Nature Genetics. 48: 624-633, doi:10.1038/ng.3552
Mehta, D.,.....M.C. Mills, N.R Way, S.Hong Lee. (2016). Evidence for genetic overlap between schizophrenia and age at first birth in women. JAMA Psychiatry, 73(3):193-194. doi:10.1001/jamapsychiatry.2015.2964.
Stulp, G., R. Sear, M.Mills, L. Barrett. (2016). The reproductive ecology of industrial societies: the association between wealth and fertility, Human Nature: An Interdisciplinary Biosocial Perspective, 27: 445-470, doi: doi:10.1007/s12110-016-9272-9
Täht, K. & M. Mills. (2016). Out of Time. The consequences of nonstandard employment schedules for family cohesion. New York: Springer. CLICK HERE for a description of this book.
Mills, M.C. & P. Präg. (2016). Methodological Advances in Cross-National Research: Multilevel Challenges and Solutions, European Sociological Review, 32(1): 1-2. doi: 10.1093/esr/jcw009
Präg, P., M. Mills & R.P.M. Wittek. (2016). Subjective Socioeconomic Status and Health in Cross-National Comparison, Social Science & Medicine, 149: 84-92. doi: 10.1016/j.socscimed.2015.11.044.

2015

Visser, M., L. Heyse, M.Mills & R.P.M. Wittek (2016) Enabling work life balance in an unbalanced environment: Job autonomy and trust in management among humanitarian aid expatriates. Nonprofit and Voluntary Sector Quarterly, 45(6): 1191-1213. DOI: 10.1177/0899764016634890
Potârcă, G & M. Mills. (2015). Racial preferences in online dating across European countries, European Sociological Review, doi: 10.1093/es/jcu093.
Sweeney, M., Castro, T. & M. Mills. (2015). The reproductive context of cohabitation in a comparative perspective, Demographic Research, 32(5): 147-182.

References 

1969 births
Fellows of Nuffield College, Oxford
Academics of the University of Oxford
Living people
British sociologists
People from Red Deer, Alberta
British women sociologists
Canadian women sociologists
Canadian sociologists
Canadian Members of the Order of the British Empire
Fellows of the British Academy
Academic journal editors